The Oglio (Latin Ollius, or Olius; Lombard Òi; Cremonese Ùi) is a left-side tributary of the river Po in Lombardy, Italy.
In the hierarchy of the Po's tributaries, with its  of length, it occupies the 2nd place per length (after the river Adda), while it is the 4th per basin surface (after Tanaro, Adda and Ticino), and the 3rd per average discharge at the mouth (after Ticino and Adda).

Overview
The Oglio is formed from the confluence of two mountain streams, the Narcanello branch from the Presena Glacier, in the Adamello group and the Frigidolfo branch, in the Corno dei Tre Signori, part of the Stelvio National Park.

It flows in a southwest direction, through Valcamonica and enters into the Lake Iseo at Costa Volpino. It leaves Lake Iseo at Sarnico and, after traveling a zone of moraine deposits, it joins the Po river at Torredoglio, not far from Cesole and Scorzarolo, in the province of Mantua. It is part of the larger Po-Adige basin.

The course of the river main branch

Camonica Valley section

The following is a list (incomplete) of the tributaries in the Camonica Valley:
 Frigidolfo and Narcanello branches, also known as Oglio Frigidolfo and Oglio Narcanello, respectively, in Ponte di Legno at  merge forming the main branch
 Valpaghera, at Vezza d'Oglio 
 Valgrande, at Vezza d'Oglio 
 Ogliolo branch, at Edolo 
 Rabbia, at Sonico 
 Remulo, at the border between Sonico and Malonno 
 Allione, at the border between Malonno and Berzo Demo 
 Poia river, at Cedegolo 
 Re, at Sellero 
 Re, at Capo di Ponte 
 Clegna, at Capo di Ponte 
 Figna, at municipal border between Nadro, Ceto and Ono San Pietro 
 Blé stream, at municipal border between Cerveno and Ceto 
 Palobbia creek, at municipal border between Ceto and Braone, near the quadruple municipal border with Losine and Cerveno 
 Poia creek, at Losine 
 Re, at Losine, near the municipal border between with Niardo 
 Lanico stream, at the municipal border between Malegno and Cividate Camuno 
 Trobiolo, at Cividate Camuno, near the municipal border with Cogno, Piancogno 
 Grigna stream, Esine near the municipal border with Piancogno 
 Resio, at Esine 
 Davine river, at Darfo Boario Terme 
 Budrio stream, at Erbanno, Darfo Boario Terme 
 Dezzo river, at Darfo Boario Terme 
 Gleno, at the triple municipal border between Vilminore di Scalve, Colere and Azzone
 Re stream, at Darfo Boario Terme 
 Orso creek, at Rogno 
 Supine creek, at Costa Volpino

Lake Iseo section
At Costa Volpino, the Oglio river enters the Iseo lake with a mixed delta-estuary mouth.

Po Valley section
The Oglio main branch leaves the lake at the provincial border between Sarnico, Bergamo and Paratico, Brescia  and begins to follow (approximately) this provincial border.
At the triple provincial border between Torre Pallavicina (Bergamo), Roccafranca (Brescia) and Soncino (Cremona)  the Oglio begins to follow (approximately) the provincial border between the Brescia-Cremona provincial border.

The major tributaries in the Po valley are the following:
 Cherio river, at the provincial border between Palosco, Bergamo and Pontoglio, Brescia 
 Mella river, at the provincial border and triple municipal border between Seniga (Brescia), Ostiano (Brescia), and Gabbioneta-Binanuova (Cremona) 
 Chiese river, at the triple provincial border between Canneto sull'Oglio (Brescia), Acquanegra sul Chiese (Mantua) and Calvatone (Cremona) 
At this triple provincial border the Oglio river begins following the Mantua-Cremona provincial border, which leaves at the triple municipal border between Acquanegra sul Chiese (Mantua), Calvatone (Cremona) and Bozzolo (Mantua)  where the river enters entirely in the Mantua province.

At the municipal border between Marcaria and Viadana , the Oglio river enters the Po river.

External links

Rivers of Lombardy
Rivers of the Province of Bergamo
Rivers of the Province of Brescia
Rivers of the Province of Cremona
Rivers of the Province of Mantua
Rivers of the Alps
Rivers of Italy